I Want to Marry Ryan Banks (also known as Reality of Love) is a 2004 television film starring Jason Priestley, Bradley Cooper and Emma Caulfield.

Plot
Ryan Banks is a struggling movie star. His best friend and agent, Todd Doherty, creates a TV show called I Want to Marry Ryan Banks in hopes of saving Banks's faltering career. The show works much like the Bachelor TV show, with fifteen beautiful women competing for Banks's love and affection.

Charlie Norton becomes a contestant when her sister and brother-in-law submit an audition tape for her. Like all the other girls, Norton is picked in order to help boost Banks's image. She is then contacted at her sister's Boston bar by Banks himself, and decides to participate on the show.

Once in the house, Norton becomes fast friends with her roommate Lauren, an aspiring actress who is only using the show to get exposure. She also discovers how "reality" TV shows work, with multiple takes and editing.

As Norton thinks she is falling for Banks, Doherty is feeding him lines. When Norton discovers the man she is in love with is really Doherty, she tries to quit the show, only to find out that it would breach her contract. As "America's choice", Norton and Lauren become the two finalists, despite Norton trying to sabotage her own chances by changing her sweet and easy-going behavior while on a trip with Banks.

With Banks's help, Doherty manages to get Norton back, and they are married a year later.

Cast
Jason Priestley as Ryan Banks
Bradley Cooper as Todd Doherty
Emma Caulfield as Charlie Norton
Mark L. Walberg as Stan
Lauren Lee Smith as Lauren, Charlie's roommate

Home media
The movie was released on DVD in 2012 under the title Reality of Love.

References

External links
 
 

Canadian comedy television films
English-language Canadian films
ABC Family original films
2004 television films
2004 films
2004 romantic comedy films
Films about weddings
Canadian romantic comedy films
American romantic comedy films
American comedy television films
Films directed by Sheldon Larry
2000s American films
2000s Canadian films